= Buurdaakh =

Place in Yakutia, Russia

Coordinates: 68°14′N 150°34′E

Buurdaakh is a populated place in Yakutia, Russia.
